James Montgomery may refer to:

Clergy
 James Montgomery (Archdeacon of Raphoe), from 1783 to 1797
 James Montgomery (priest) (1818–1897), Provost of St Mary's Cathedral, Edinburgh
 James Alan Montgomery (1866–1949), American Episcopalian clergyman and Oriental scholar
 James Shera Montgomery (1864–1952), American Methodist minister
 James W. Montgomery (1921–2019), bishop of Chicago in the Episcopal church

Sportspeople
 James Montgomery (boxer) (1934–2015), Canadian Olympic boxer
 James Montgomery (footballer, born 1890) (1890–1960), English footballer
 James Montgomery (footballer, born 1943), English footballer
 James Montgomery (footballer, born 1994), English footballer

Others
 Sir James Montgomery, 4th Baronet (died 1694), Scottish politician
 Sir James Montgomery, 1st Baronet (1721–1803), Scottish politician and judge
 Sir James Montgomery, 2nd Baronet (1766–1839), Scottish peer, politician and lawyer
 James Montgomery (poet) (1771–1854), British hymnodist, poet and editor
 James Montgomery (colonel) (1814–1871), American civil war colonel
 James Montgomery Bailey (1841–1894), American journalist
 James Montgomery Flagg (1877–1960), American artist and illustrator
 James D. Montgomery (attorney) (born 1932), African-American civil rights attorney in Chicago and Trustee of the University of Illinois
 James Montgomery (composer) (born 1943), Canadian composer, performer, and arts administrator
 James Montgomery (singer) (born 1949), American blues singer and harmonica player, active since the early 1970s
 James D. Montgomery (economist) (born 1963), labor market economist at the University of Madison, Wisconsin

In fiction
 James "Hunter" Montgomery, character on the television series Queer as Folk

See also
 James Montgomerie (1755–1829), British Army officer and colonial administrator
 James Montgomrey (1811–1883), Brentford benefactor and timber mill owner
 Jim Montgomery (disambiguation)